Beetoomba is a closed station located near Berringama, on the Cudgewa railway line in Victoria, Australia. Today there is nothing left of the station apart from a platform mound and buffer stop.

The passenger platform was shortened from 15.5m to 8.5m in 1976.

References

Disused railway stations in Victoria (Australia)
Shire of Towong